John Batchelor (born 1948) is an American author and radio show host.

John Batchelor may also refer to:

John Batchelor (missionary) (1855–1944), English missionary and first person to study the Ainu in depth
John Batchelor (illustrator) (1936–2019), English technical illustrator
John Batchelor (racing) (1959–2010), British racing team owner and ex-chairman of York City FC
John Batchelor (politician) (1820–1883), British politician and businessman
John Batchelor (actor) (born 1969), Australian television actor
John Batchelor (rugby player) (born 1970), English rugby player
John Batchelor (trade unionist) (1842–1929), British trade union leader